Peñarrubia, officially the Municipality of Peñarrubia, is a 6th class municipality in the province of Abra, Philippines. According to the 2020 census, it has a population of 6,951 people.

Geography

According to the Philippine Statistics Authority, the municipality has a land area of  constituting  of the  total area of Abra.

Barangays
Peñarrubia is politically subdivided into 9 barangays. These barangays are headed by elected officials: Barangay Captain, Barangay Council, whose members are called Barangay Councilors. All are elected every three years.

Climate

Demographics

In the 2020 census, Peñarrubia had a population of 6,951.

Economy

Government
Peñarrubia, belonging to the lone congressional district of the province of Abra, is governed by a mayor designated as its local chief executive and by a municipal council as its legislative body in accordance with the Local Government Code. The mayor, vice mayor, and the councilors are elected directly by the people through an election which is being held every three years.

Elected officials

Antonio Amasi Domes-ag was OIC Mayor of the town in 1989–1992, then elected as mayor in 1992–1995, and again for the term 1995–1998. He was replaced by his wife Lovelyn Domes-ag in 1998-2001 and 2001–2004. The election of 2004 became controversial in the whole nation when both husband and wife ran for mayoralty candidate. Antonio Domes-ag was proclaimed as the winner. In the May 2007 election, incumbent Vice Mayor Geraldine Mamsaang-Balbuena won in a matter of one vote against Antonio A. Domes-ag.

The present municipal mayor is still Jane Mamsaang-Cecilia.

References

External links

 [ Philippine Standard Geographic Code]

Municipalities of Abra (province)